Będomin  is a Kashubian village in the administrative district of Gmina Nowa Karczma, within Kościerzyna County, Pomeranian Voivodeship, in northern Poland.

For details of the history of the region, see History of Pomerania.

The village has a population of 212.

There is here an old oak (Wybicki Oak).

Notable people 
 Józef Wybicki (1747–1822) a Polish jurist, poet, political and military activist, best remembered as the author of "Mazurek Dąbrowskiego" which was adopted as the Polish national anthem in 1927

References

Villages in Kościerzyna County